Cortinarius evernius is an inedible fungus in the family Cortinariaceae. Cortinarius evernius is grayish brown or grayish purple. The cap is convex and it has remnants of the membrane. The stipe is grayish purple and it has remnants of the membrane in a zig-zag pattern. The gills are greyish purple in the beginning, then brownish. The mushroom grows in coniferous forests for example near swamps.

Description 
The mushroom cap is 3–9 cm wide, conical when young and then umbonate, reddish to violet-brown, often with a white-edged margin, smooth (possibly silky in appearance) and dry, with a mild odor. The gills adnate or notched, violet then brown. The spores are brown and elliptical.

Its edibility is unknown, but is not recommended due to related species which are deadly poisonous.

Similar species 
Similar species include Cortinarius brunneus, C. obtusus, and C. vernus.

See also
List of Cortinarius species

References

evernius